Richard Farman (1872–1940) was a British-French aeronautical engineer, aviator, and eldest of the Farman brothers who were pioneers of early aviation. He was better known as Dick Farman using the then popular sobriquet in place of the formal Richard.

Biography

Born in Paris, France to British parents, he was the eldest son of a well to do newspaper correspondent working there. With his brothers he was educated at home and they were allowed unusual freedom to follow personal interests. With his brother Henry, who was also trained as an engineer, he set up Paris's largest automobile agency, the Palais de l'Automobile, dealing in Delaunay-Bellevilles, Panhard-Levassors, and Renaults. Together they wrote The Aviator's Companion, published in 1910, describing their early flying achievements.

He became an electrical engineer, and built the first electric trams in Brazil, in Rio de Janeiro. He was an author of many technical works on engines, also an aviator in 1914 to 1918, and was a director of an aircraft factory in Lyon.

After World War I, he founded Avions H.M.D. Farman, also known as Farman Aviation Works, with his two younger brothers Henri and Maurice, in Boulogne-Billancourt.

Dick concentrated on the business side of manufacture at Société Anonyme des Usines Farman and their airline, which became part of Air France in 1933. He is rarely mentioned in most Farman stories in later days.
In spite of his scientific knowledge and techniques, he dealt with administrative and commercial services. At the age of 65 Dick retired, after the French nationalization of its aircraft industry in 1937 ended their independence, the brothers refusing to remain as employees. Dick Farman died in Paris 31 January 1940.

Notes

References

French people of English descent
French aerospace engineers
French aviators
1872 births
1940 deaths